A Baby Story is an American reality series that began airing on TLC and Discovery Channel in 1998 until 2007.

Overview
The series follows a couple through the late days of their pregnancy, sometimes presenting a baby shower, last family outing, or dinner party. Then, it always pops up the family getting ready to go to the hospital, birth center, or prepare for a homebirth. It films the labor and birth, which is shown in the series. At the end, the family talks about life after the newborn and offers the baby a few weeks after birth. The couple then plays with their child for a little before the series ends.

Storyline
According to the producers of the series, the intent was to include a happy ending at the end of every episode.

Return
In 2016, TLC revived the show by livestreaming a childbirth via Facebook.

References

External links
 

1998 American television series debuts
1990s American reality television series
2000s American reality television series
2007 American television series endings
English-language television shows
TLC (TV network) original programming
Television shows set in the United States
Discovery Channel original programming